Parceria dos Viajantes is the eighteenth album by Brazilian solo artist Zé Ramalho. It was released in 2007. the album features several famous Brazilian artists, like Zélia Duncan, Daniela Mercury and Pitty, as well as American singer-songwriter Alana Marie.

Track listing

Personnel 
 Zé Ramalho – Acoustic guitar and  lead vocals on all tracks, arrangement on tracks 1, 2, 3, 4, 5, 6, 11, keyboards on track 1, twelve-string viola on track 2, harmonica on track 2
 Robertinho de Recife – Arrangement on all tracks except for 9, electric guitar on tracks 1, 3, 4, 5, 6, 7, 11, ukulele on track 1, slide guitar on track 2, sound effects on track 2, bass guitar on tracks 3, 6, 7, 8, 9, 10, keyboards on track 7, sitar on track 10, Portuguese guitar on track 10
 Paulo Ricardo – Bass guitar on tracks 1, 2, 5
 Chico Guedes – Bass guitar on tracks 4, 11
 João Barone – Drums on tracks 1, 3, 5, 6, 7
 Marcelo Bonfá – Drums on track 2
 Edu Constant – Drums on tracks 4, 11
 Marcos Bolais – Keyboards on track 5
 Dodô de Moraes – Accordion on track 1, organ on track 1, keyboards on tracks 4, 6, 8
 Zé Gomes – Percussion on tracks 1, 3, 4, 5, 6, 7, 11
 Marcos Suzano – Percussion on track 10
 Jeferson Victor – Trumpet on track 1, 3
 Bidu Cordeiro – Trumpet on track 3
 Monteiro Jr. – Tenor saxophone on track 3
 Toti Cavalcanti – Bassoon on track 4, trumpet on track 8
 Roberta de Recife – Choir on tracks 5, 11, vocalise on track 7
 Zita, Diva, Edite, Francisco José, Mariana – Choir on track 5
 João Ramalho  and Erika Valente – Choir on track 11
 Franco Sattamini – Arrangement and all other instruments (except for acoustic guitar and bass guitar) on track 9

References

2007 albums
Zé Ramalho albums